Ashkan may refer to:

Places in Iran
Ashkan, Hormozgan, a village in Bashagard County, Hormozgan Province
Ashkan-e Olya, a village in Sardasht County, West Azerbaijan Province
Tang Ashkan, a village in Khamir County, Hormozgan Province

People
Ashkan Dejagah (born 1986), Iranian professional footballer
Ashkan Mokhtarian (born 1985), Iranian-born Australian mixed martial artist
Ashkan Pouya (born 1976), Swedish entrepreneur and the co-founder of Serendipity Group

See also
 Ashcan (disambiguation)